Peter Fitzpatrick (born 17 July 1959) is a former Australian rules footballer who played with Carlton and St Kilda in the Victorian Football League (VFL). After finishing his career in the VFL, he moved to the Victorian Football Association (VFA), where he spent a period as captain of Sandringham Football Club. He also played for fellow VFA club Port Melbourne, and for Woodville in the South Australian National Football League (SANFL).

Notes

External links 

Peter Fitzpatrick's profile at Blueseum

1959 births
Carlton Football Club players
St Kilda Football Club players
Golden Square Football Club players
Sandringham Football Club players
Australian rules footballers from Victoria (Australia)
Living people
Port Melbourne Football Club players
Woodville Football Club players